Xantolis tomentosa, the wooly ironwood, is a forest tree commonly found in  India, Sri Lanka and a few other nearby countries.

References

External links
 
 
 

Chrysophylloideae